Ngân Văn Đại (born 9 February 1992) is a professional Vietnamese footballer who plays as a forward for V.League club Hải Phòng.

Honours
Sài Gòn
V.League 2: 2015

Hà Nội
V.League 1: 2018, 2019; Runner-up: 2020  
Vietnamese National Cup: 2019, 2020
Vietnamese Super Cup: 2019, 2020, 2021

External links

References

1992 births
Living people
Association football forwards
Vietnamese footballers
V.League 1 players
Saigon FC players
Hanoi FC players
V.League 2 players
Quang Nam FC players
Vietnam international footballers
People from Nghệ An province
2019 AFC Asian Cup players